This list is of the Cultural Properties of Japan designated in the category of  for the Prefecture of Tokushima.

National Cultural Properties
As of 1 February 2015, one Important Cultural Property has been designated, being of national significance.

Prefectural Cultural Properties
As of 19 December 2014, five properties have been designated at a prefectural level.

Municipal Cultural Properties
Properties designated at the municipal level include the following:

See also
 Cultural Properties of Japan
 List of National Treasures of Japan (historical materials)
 List of Historic Sites of Japan (Tokushima)
 List of Cultural Properties of Japan - paintings (Tokushima)

References

External links
  List of Cultural Properties in Tokushima Prefecture

Cultural Properties,historical materials
Historical materials,Tokushima